David Wheeler may refer to:

 David Wheeler (computer scientist) (1927–2004), British computer scientist
 David Wheeler (footballer) (born 1990), English footballer for Wycombe Wanderers
 David Wheeler (stage director) (c. 1925–2012), American director of theatre and film
 David Wheeler (Alabama politician) (c. 1949–March 9, 2022), member of the Alabama House of Representatives
 David Wheeler (South Dakota politician), member of the South Dakota Senate
 David H. Wheeler (1829–1902), American academic, newspaperman and college president; US ambassador to Italy
 David P. Wheeler (1876–1904), United States Army captain
 David Thewlis (David Wheeler, born 1963), English actor and writer